Patricia "Trish" Telesco (born 1960) is an American author, herbalist, poet, lecturer, Wiccan priestess, and folk magician who has written more than 60 books on a variety of subjects ranging from self-help and cookbooks to magic, folklore and global religion. Articles by Telesco have appeared in several mainstream publications such as Cosmo, Woman's World, and Cats' Magazine, and in such Neopagan publications such as Circle Network News and popular websites such as The Witches' Voice.

Telesco began her Wiccan education and initiation on her own, but later received initiation into the Strega tradition of Italy. She is a trustee for the Universal Federation of Pagans, a member of the Authors Guild, a member of the Society for Creative Anachronism and a professional member of the Wiccan-Pagan Press Alliance. She (or her writing) has appeared on several television segments including Sightings and National Geographic Today – Solstice Celebrations. She has also appeared at major events in the New Age and Neopagan communities such as the Starwood Festival and Pagan Spirit Gathering. She runs a mail-order business called Hourglass Creations, and lives in Western New York, with her husband, two sons, and middle non-binary child.

Bibliography

 Cat Magic: Mews, Myths, and Mystery (1999) Destiny Books , 
 A Charmed Life (2000) New Page Books , 
 The Cyber Spellbook: Magick in the Virtual World (2000) New Page Books , 
 An Enchanted Life : An Adept's Guide to Masterful Magick (2001) New Page Books , 
 A Floral Grimoire: Plant Charms, Spells, Recipes, and Rituals (2001) Citadel , 
 Futuretelling: A Complete Guide to Divination (1998) Crossing Press , 
 Ghosts, Spirits and Hauntings (1999) Crossing Press , 
 Goddess in My Pocket: Simple Spells, Charms, Potions, and Chants to Get You Everything You Want (1998) HarperSanFrancisco , 
 Healer's Handbook: A Holistic Guide to Wellness in the New Age (1997) Weiser Books , 
 The Herbal Arts: A Handbook of Gardening, Recipes, Healing, Crafts, and Spirituality (1998) Citadel , 
 How To Be A Wicked Witch: Good Spells, Charms, Potions and Notions for Bad Days (2000) Fireside , 
 The Kitchen Witch Companion: Simple and Sublime Culinary Magic (2005) Citadel , 
 Kitchen Witch's Guide To Brews And Potions (2005) New Page Books , 
 Labyrinth Walking: Patterns of Power (2001) Citadel , 
 The Language of Dreams (1997) Crossing Press , 
 A Little Book of Love Magic (1999) Crossing Press , 
 A Little Book of Mirror Magic: Meditations, Myths, Spells (2003) Crossing Press , 
 The Magick of Folk Wisdom (2000) Book Sales , 
 Mastering Candle Magick (2003) New Page Books , 
 Mirror, Mirror: Reflections of the Sacred Self (1999) Book World , 
 Money Magick: How to Use Magick to Gain Prosperity (2001) New Page Books , 
 Seasons of the Sun: Celebrations from the World's Spiritual Traditions (1996) Atrium Publishers Group , 
 Shaman in a 9 to 5 World (2000) The Crossing Press , 
 Spinning Spells, Weaving Wonders: Modern Magic for Everyday Life (1996) Crossing Press , 
 The Teen Book Of Shadows: Star Signs, Spells, Potions, and Powers (2004) Citadel , 
 365 Goddess: A Daily Guide to the Magic and Inspiration of the Goddess (1998) HarperOne , 
 A Victorian Grimoire: Romance - Enchantment - Magic (2002) Llewellyn Publications , 
 The Wiccan Web: Surfing the Magic on the Internet (2001) Citadel , 
 Wishing Well: Empowering Your Hopes and Dreams (1997) Crossing Press , 
 A Witch's Beverages and Brews (2000) Career Press , 
 The Witch's Book of Wisdom (2003) Citadel , 
 Your Book of Shadows: How to Write Your Own Magickal Spells (2000) Citadel ,

References

1960 births
Living people
American occult writers